Herman Fetzer (24 June 1899 - 17 January 1935), better known as "Jake Falstaff" to Akron Times and Cleveland Press readers, was an American writer and journalist.

Biography
He was born in Maple Valley, Ohio, to Lydia Meyer and Levi E. Fetzer. After graduating from Akron's West High School, he worked as suburban reporter for the Akron Times, where in 1920 he began his column Pippins and Cheese, taking its title and his pen name from William Shakespeare's Merry Wives of Windsor.  Except for a short sabbatical serving as managing editor of the St. Petersburg Times (now the Tampa Bay Times) and head of the Cleveland's The Plain Dealers Akron bureau, Fetzer remained with the Times until its merger into the Akron Times-Press.  Herman married Hazel May Stevenson on August 5, 1922, in Akron.  Together, they had no children.  Herman died January 17, 1935, from pneumonia. Fetzer was buried in Canaan, Ohio.  He is listed in the encyclopaedia of Cleveland History.

Career
He worked briefly for the Akron Beacon Journal and published several books, two of them based on his Teutonic folk hero, Reini Kugel.  While working at the Akron Beacon Journal, his desk sat adjacent to writer Josephine van der Grift, columnist of Demi-Tasse and Mrs. Grundy.  He was Josephine's neighbor when he lived at 508 Buchtel Avenue in Akron.  Upon her death in 1927, Herman wrote a full front page tribute to Josephine for the Akron Beacon Journal on August 23, 1927, which was reprinted in November of the same year.

Fetzer's reputation spread as he published articles, poems, and stories in The New Yorker, The Nation, Collier's, and Liberty.  In the summers of 1929 and 1930, he wrote the Conning Tower column for the vacationing Franklin Pierce Adams in the New York World.  Lured to the Cleveland Press early in 1930, Fetzer not only contributed Pippins and Cheese but also did rewrites, editorials, and features until his early death from lung cancer. Largely through the efforts of his widow, Hazel, several volumes of his work were published posthumously: The Bulls of Spring: Selected Poems (1937); 3 volumes of Ohio farm stories culled from a "Rural Vacation" series composed for the Press; a representative Fetzer anthology, Pippins and Cheese (1960); and Jake Falstaff Selections to Make You Thirsty (1969). 

An inventory of his works is held in a repository at the University of Akron.  The collection consists of manuscripts, correspondence, newspaper clippings, photographs and miscellaneous material concerning Fetzer's life and work as a newspaper man and writer. After Fetzer's death, his wife, Hazel "Toni" Fetzer and a New York agent, Sally Harrison, edited his poetry and prose.

Selected bibliography 
 The Big Snow, Christmas at Jacoby's Corners. Boston, Houghton Mifflin company.
 The Book of Rabelais. Garden City, N.Y., Doubleday, Doran & company, inc., 1928.
 The Bulls of Spring: The Selected Poems of Jake Falstaff. New York, G.P. Putnam's Sons, 1937.
 Come Back to Wayne County. Boston, Houghton Mifflin company.
 Jacoby's Corners. Boston, Houghton Mifflin company.
 Reini Kugel: Lover of this Earth. Garden City, N.Y., Doubleday, Doran, 1929.
 Pippins and Cheese. Brookside Press, 1960.

References

 Herman Fetzer. The New York Times. January 18, 1935. p. 24
 Latest Works of Fiction. The New York Times. November 1, 1942. p. BR24

1899 births
1935 deaths